David Grégoire Van Reybrouck (born 11 September 1971, in Bruges) is a Belgian cultural historian, archaeologist and author. He writes historical fiction, literary non-fiction, novels, poetry, plays and academic texts. He has received several Dutch literary prizes, including AKO Literature Prize (2010) and Libris History Prize.

Background and education
Van Reybrouck was born into a family of florists, bookbinders and artists. His father, a farmer's son, spent five years in the Democratic Republic of the Congo as a railway engineer immediately after independence. He holds a doctorate from Leiden University.

Writings
Van Reybrouck's first book,  De Plaag (in English: The Plague), was a cross between a travelogue and a literary whodunnit set in post-apartheid South Africa. It received several awards, including the prize for the best Flemish debut in 2002 and a shortlist nomination for the Gouden Uil, one of the leading literary prizes in the Low Countries. It was translated into Afrikaans, French and Hungarian. A longtime op-ed writer for the Flemish national newspaper De Morgen, Van Reybrouck has co-edited a volume on the federal future of Belgium (What Belgium Stands For: a Scenario, 2007) and a thought-provoking pamphlet,  Pleidooi voor populisme (A Plea for Populism, 2008), which was met with controversy. The latter won the Netherlands' most distinguished essay prize.

His book Congo. Een geschiedenis (in English: Congo: The Epic History of a People) was published in 2010. Over the years, Van Reybrouck has travelled extensively throughout Africa. The book is as much the result of his ten journeys through the Democratic Republic of the Congo as of the months spent in libraries and archives. He has interviewed hundreds of individuals, with a particular predilection for so-called "ordinary people", precisely because their lives and choices are so often extraordinary. The book portrays slavery and colonialism, resistance and survival. It includes archival material, interviews and personal observations. Congo. Een geschiedenis has been translated into English, French, German, Italian, Norwegian, Polish, Swedish, Danish and Finnish. Van Reybrouck has also been actively involved in organising literary workshops for Congolese playwrights in Kinshasa and Goma.

In 2020 he published Revolusi which applies to Indonesia the method he used in Congo - a combination of interviews with Indonesian Nationalists and genocide perpetrators that live in complete impunity. Discussing the events that lead to start of Indonesia's military dictatorship, with historical interpretation.

In his book Against Elections: The Case for Democracy he advocates for a deliberative democracy based on sortition.

Awards and honors

2004, Taalunie Toneelschrijfprijs
2007, Royal Academy of Dutch language and literature
2008, Ark Prize of the Free Word, Missie (play)
2010, AKO Literature Prize, Congo
2012, Prix Médicis essai, Congo
2014, Gouden Ganzenveer
2015, Doctor Honoris Causa of Saint-Louis University, Brussels
2017, European Book Prize, fiction for Zink. Although a work of non-fiction, it won the fiction category.
2018, European Press Prize, nominated with "Should media report differently in the wake of attacks? Think about it and join the discussion!"

Publications (English)
2000, From Primitives to Primates. A history of ethnographic and primatological analogies in the study of prehistory. Leiden, Sidestone Press, 2012. (Dissertation Leiden University, 2000). 
2008, Missie (play)
2014, Congo: The Epic History of a People. Transl. by Sam Garrett. HarperCollins, 2014. 
2015, The First World War Now 
2016, Against Elections: The Case for Democracy,

Publication (Dutch)
2016, essay "Zink" about Neutral Moresnet.
2020, Revolusi - Indonesië en het ontstaan van de moderne wereld, De Bezige Bij, Amsterdam 2020,

References

This article is wholly or partly based on material from Dutch Wikipedia

External links
 David van Reybrouck's personal website
 David van Reybrouck's publisher's website

Flemish writers
Belgian archaeologists
Historians of Africa
21st-century Belgian historians
Prix Médicis essai winners
Writers from Bruges
1971 births
Living people